Pongchanok Kunklab (born 7 October 1991) is a Thai athlete and winner of Miss Thailand World 2009. Kanklab is from Bangkok and has represented her country in taekwando competitions. In January 2010, the World Taekwondo Federation chose Kanklab as their Goodwill Ambassador.

References

External links
Miss World profile

Living people
1991 births
Pongchanok Kanklab
Pongchanok Kanklab
Pongchanok Kanklab
Miss World 2009 delegates
Miss Thailand World
Pongchanok Kanklab